The Last Valley may refer to:

 The Last Valley (novel), an historical novel about the Thirty Years' War
 The Last Valley (film), a 1971 film adaptation of the novel directed by James Clavell